Robinson: Revanschen is the fifteenth season of the Swedish version of Survivor, and was the last season to air on the Swedish television channel TV4. Paolo Roberto returned to host this season, which featured former contestants from previous seasons returning for another chance to win the game.

Contestants

The Total Votes is the number of votes a castaway has received during Tribal Councils where the castaway is eligible to be voted out of the game. It does not include the votes received during the final Tribal Council.

Cameos

The game

In the case of multiple tribes or castaways who wins the challenge, they are listed in order of finish, or alphabetically where it was a team effort; where one castaway won and invited others, the invitees are in brackets.

Episode Quotes
Translation of the original Swedish episode quotes and who that said it is listed here:
No episode quote during the first episode.
"He is a bulldozer but he started to gore me like a bull." – Robert "Robban" Andersson
"A flying crow finds more than a sitting crow." – Leif Svensson
"That there are stupid people in the team is something that I can't take responsibility for..." – Johnny Leinonen
"I mean, imagine yourselves... It was like this bleh bleh bleh..." – Deniz Özen

Challenges

Episode 1
Individual Immunity Challenge: Nine of the twelve castaways (not Leif, Mirre and Robban) competed in an endurance challenge. They had to stand on footholds and support their hands inside a wooden frame above the water. The last person standing would win individual immunity for the first Tribal Council.
After about an hour, Anna won against runner-up Susanne and received immunity. Hjalmtyr, who fell into the water first, were sent to 'The Other Side'.

Teamleader Challenge: The other three castaways competed in a challenge, where they had to smash open ten crates with a sledgehammer. Inside the crates were rings that they would put one at a time at the top of a climbing frame. The first person who would get their five rings placed at the top would win the challenge.
After a close battle, Leif won just barely before Robban. Mirre, who came in last, got sent to 'The Other Side'. Leif and Robban got to split the remaining castaways between themselves into two tribes, Guntao and Tigas.

Episode 2
Duel Challenge: Johnny (chosen from Guntao) and Sophie (chosen from Tigas) competed in a duel. They had to place their hands on each plate on a table. When the candle on it goes out, the first person who touches the middle plate on the table wins.
In the end, Johnny's hand were on the plate first and won. He then had to choose between three rewards (mosquito nets, crab traps or fishing equipment); The better reward - the worse punishment for the opposing team.

Immunity Challenge: Guntao and Tigas competed as teams in this challenge, where one from each tribe will hold on to a pole while two opposing tribemates will have to drag away him/her from the pole and over the finish line. The first team who wins two matches wins the challenge.
Tigas won against Guntao with 2-1, and therefore Guntao were sent to Tribal Council that same night.

Episode 3
Individual Challenge: Guntao and Tigas competed as individuals in this challenge. They had to dig up weights inside an enclosure, and place those weights one at a time on seven ports. When four or five weights have been placed on a specific port, the last person who placed the last weight can escape through it. The two contestants who are remaining when all seven ports have been opened will lose the challenge.
Sanna and Sophie became the two remaining inside the enclosure and had to face each other in a duel the following day.

Duel Challenge: Sanna and Sophie competed in a duel, where they had to stand on their toes while pressing a cube with their heads against a leaking bucket of paint. The person who would stand the longest would win the challenge.
Afterwards, it was Sophie who stepped down first, despite Sanna already had emptied her bucket. Therefore, Sophie was eliminated from the game.

Episode 4
Immunity Challenge: Guntao and Tigas sent two people each, in which they had to choose the best of those four to compete against two of the Other Side team. In this challenge, they had to push against a log to drive out the opponents. Best out of three would win this challenge.
In the end, Leif (from Guntao) and Susanne (from Tigas) won against Beatrice and Micha from the Other Side, and therefore sent the Other Side to Tribal Council.

Episode 5
Reward Challenge: Guntao and Tigas competed as teams in this challenge, where before they started; the two individuals voted the weakest links in each team (Johnny and Deniz) switched teams. Then the teams had to paddle their canoe along the river to pontons. The first team who get all their tribemates on it wins the challenge.
Tigas won (together with Johnny), as they also got two contestants from the Other Side as their reward. They chose Micha and Mirre, which meant Beatrice became a member of Guntao.

Teamleader Challenge: Martin and Mats competed in an arm wrestling challenge. Best out of three matches would win the challenge.
In the end, it was Martin who won 2-0 and got to join the winning tribe of Tigas, while Mats joined Guntao.

Voting history

 At the second tribal council Mirre was given two votes to cast as tribe leader.

 At the fourth tribal council Robban was given two votes to cast as tribe leader.

 When it came time for the winner to be decided both Mirre and Robban were placed on crucifixes that were each held by a set of three ropes. The two were told that they would alternate picking a member of the jury (Anna, Susanne, Sanna, Mia, and Beatrice) who in turn would cut the rope of the player they didn't want to win. Mirre won the right to choose first and picked Beatrice, Mia was then chosen by Robban, and Susanne was picked third by Mirre. As all three women cut one of Robban's ropes Mirre won the competition thus Anna and Sanna did not need to vote.

References

External links
http://www.tv4.se/robinson

 2012 The Revenge
2012 Swedish television seasons